The Alcántara Dam, also known as the José María de Oriol Dam, is a buttress dam on the Tagus River near Alcántara in the province of Cáceres, Spain. It is named after the politician and captain of the Spanish electricity industry José María de Oriol y Urquijo. The dam regulates much of the flow of the Tagus River, the longest of the Iberian Peninsula. It was built in 1969 and is the second largest reservoir in Europe.

The Roman Alcántara Bridge is located 600 m downstream from the dam.

References

External links

 "Empresas ICA S.A.B. de C.V. (ICA)" - Reuters

Dams in Spain
Hydroelectric power stations in Spain
Buttress dams in Spain
Dams completed in 1969
Dams on the Tagus
Buildings and structures in the Province of Cáceres
Energy in Extremadura